Larry Bird (born October 17, 1945) is a former professional Canadian football offensive lineman who played nine seasons in the Canadian Football League, mainly for the Saskatchewan Roughriders from 1967 through 1978.

References

 Career stats

1945 births
Living people
Canadian players of Canadian football
Canadian football offensive linemen
Edmonton Elks players
Saskatchewan Roughriders players
Western Mustangs football players